Kanditheemu (Dhivehi: ކަނޑިތީމު) is one of the inhabited islands of Shaviyani Atoll administrative and geographically part of the Miladhummadulhu Atoll in the Maldives.

History
The oldest written sample of the Thaana script in which the Dhivehi language is written is found in Kanditheemu. It is inscribed on the door posts of the main Hukuru Miskiy (Friday mosque) of the island. The dates 1008AH (1599AD) and 1020AH (1611AD) are written on either sides of the door as the dates for the building and the renewal of the roof during the reigns of Ibrahim Kalaafaan (Sultan Ibrahim III) and Hussain Faamuladeyri Kilege (Sultan Hussain II) respectively.

Geography
The island lies on the North West of the atoll near the border with Miladhunmadulhu-Thiladhunmathi atoll borders. 

The main occupation of the people of Kanditheemu is fishing.

Demography

References 

Divehiraajjege Jōgrafīge Vanavaru. Muhammadu Ibrahim Lutfee. G.Sōsanī. Malé 1999.
The Islands of Maldives. Hasan A. Maniku. Novelty. Male 1983.
A Concise Etymological Vocabulary of Dhivehi Language. Hasan A. Maniku. Speedmark. Colombo 2000.

Islands of the Maldives